Robert Thomas Pringle (born 1943) is an American poet, schoolmaster and park ranger.

Of Scottish descent and originally from Westerville, Ohio, from 1962 to 1987 Pringle was a schoolteacher, teaching English and biology in high schools. Since then, he has concentrated on poetry, but has also worked as a park ranger at the Inniswood Metro Gardens, as a rural mail carrier, a laboratory technician in bacteriology, a house painter, and as an attendant in a mental hospital. In 1998 he was the joint owner of a herd of Alpine goats.

His poems have been published in Orbis, Envoi, Green's Magazine, Onionhead Literary Quarterly, Poetry Motel, Lilliput Review, Psychopoetica, and Pegasus Review.

In 2004 Pringle’s poem "Ricardo Klement Speaks of Border Wars" won the First Prize in the Scottish International Open Poetry Competition.

Pringle has three children.

Poetry collections
Cold Front (Pudding House Publications, 1998) 
Inventing God (Pudding House Publications, 2008)

Notes

External links
Robert Pringle, Inventing God (searchable) at books.google.com

1943 births
American male poets
Living people
Place of birth missing (living people)